Roy Westbrook (3 January 1889 – 7 August 1961) was an Australian cricketer. He played three first-class matches for Tasmania between 1910 and 1914 and eleven matches for Otago between 1914 and 1922.

See also
 List of Tasmanian representative cricketers
 List of Otago representative cricketers

References

External links
 

1889 births
1961 deaths
Australian cricketers
Otago cricketers
Tasmania cricketers
Cricketers from Tasmania